Manuel de León Merchante (Pastrana, 1631– Alcalá de Henares, 1680) was a playwright of the Spanish Golden Age.

References 
 Felicidad Buendía. Antología del entremés (desde Lope de Rueda hasta Antonio de Zamora). Siglos XVI y XVII. Madrid: Aguilar; 1965. pp. 951–90.
 Sánchez Moltó MV. Manuel de León Marchante. Obras complutenses. Alcalá de Henares: Institución de Estudios Complutenses; 2016. 

1631 births
1680 deaths
Spanish dramatists and playwrights
Spanish male dramatists and playwrights